James Bonfield (1825–1883) was an Ontario merchant and political figure. He represented Renfrew South in the Legislative Assembly of Ontario from 1875 to 1883 as a Liberal member.

He was born in Gortmore, County Tipperary, Ireland in 1825, the son of John Bonfield, and came to Canada in 1848. He worked as a clerk for lumber merchant John Egan, later opened his own general store and afterwards became a lumber merchant in Eganville. He served as reeve for Grattan Township. In 1854, he married Catherine Tracy.

His daughter Elizabeth married John Francis Dowling who also represented Renfrew South in the provincial assembly.

The Township of Bonfield, Ontario was named in his honour.

External links 
The Canadian parliamentary companion, 1881, CH Mackintosh

The Canadian biographical dictionary and portrait gallery of eminent and self-made men  ... (1880) 

1825 births
1883 deaths
Ontario Liberal Party MPPs
Irish emigrants to Canada
Politicians from County Tipperary